On October 14, 2019, six people were killed during a shootout between drug gangs in a gun battle at the Ernesto Ramos Antonini de Río Piedras residential apartments in the Río Piedras area of San Juan, Puerto Rico.

The shooting led to alarm partly because it followed an earlier shooting in the same area that resulted in 2 deaths.  News reports were of earlier shootings in other areas, one in Cayey resulting in 3 deaths and another in a gas station that resulted in 3 deaths. The first in this series of massacres was 3 people in Ciales on June 10.

Reactions 
The governor of Puerto Rico, Wanda Vázquez Garced, held emergency meetings.

In The Bronx, NY a vigil for the victims was held.

References

Massacres in Puerto Rico
Mass murder in 2019
People murdered in Puerto Rico
October 2019 events in North America
2019 murders in Puerto Rico
Deaths by firearm in Puerto Rico